Ken Ellis may refer to:
 Ken Ellis (American football) (born 1947), American football player
 Ken Ellis (footballer, born 1928) (1928–2003), English football winger with Chester and Wrexham
 Ken Ellis (footballer, born 1948) (1948–1992), English football defender or forward with Hartlepool, Darlington and in Belgium